Disasters of the Century is a documentary television series that airs on History Television. The program is produced by Regina, Saskatchewan-based Partners in Motion.

Each episode documents two different disasters from Canada and around the world, using a mixture of re-enactments, photographs, and interviews with survivors and family members of victims. Some episodes deal with broader topics concerning disaster. For example, Washed Away investigates the destruction water can cause by looking at several disasters.

Any Televisions has different Episodes numbering schemes.

Episodes

Episode List from Partners In Motion 2012 Catalog

NOTE:  This series is offered in two formats:  65 half hour episodes and 42 hour-long episodes.  As a result, to make the 42 hour-long episodes, 19 of the half-hour shows are used twice.  Due to this fact - and the fact that so far an episode list for the half-hour version hasn't been located to date - any extraneous titles have not been able to be matched.  What follows is the information we have regarding the hour-long shows, however there may be duplications in the list as it currently shows more than 42 episodes, as well as some titles that haven't been matched to anything listed.  Any additional additions or corrections are most welcome.

 Living on the Edge: The 1903 Frank Slide, 1914 Hillcrest mine disaster 2000
 Black Week: Senghenydd mine collapse, Liverpool train collision, Loss of the SS Volturno and Johannisthal air disaster – The old adage that tragedy happens in threes was never truer than during the week of 9–17 October 1913, otherwise known as Black Week, when hundreds of miners lost their lives, two express trains collided near Liverpool, and the SS Volturno and Zeppelin L.II became beacons blazing in the night. 2002
 Nature's Fury: 1912 Regina Cyclone, 1974 Super Outbreak 2001
 Washed Away: 1954 Hurricane Hazel, 1960 Great Chilean tsunami 2001
 Out of Control: 1949 SS Noronic fire, 1942 Cocoanut Grove fire 2001
 Human Error: 1917 Halifax Explosion, 1955 24 Hours of Le Mans crash 2002
 From the Inside Out: 1953 Tangiwai disaster, 1902 Mount Pelée eruption 2002
 Critical Mass: 1907 Quebec Bridge collapse, 1919 Boston Molasses disaster 2002
 Lost in Transit: 1978 Eastman Bus Tragedy, 1956 Crash at Villa St. Louis Convent 2002
 Lost at Sea: 1967 USS Forrestal fire, 1939 HMS Thetis sinking 2002
 It Came from the Sky: 1945 Empire State Building crash, 1954 crash of Trans-Canada Air Lines Flight 9 2001
 Eye of the Storm: 1913 Great Lakes Storm of 1913, 1914 Newfoundland Sealing disaster
 Death by Water: 1921 Britannia Beach flood, 1958 Second Narrows Bridge collapse
 Up in Flames: 1916 Matheson Fire, 1960 Windsor Gas Explosion
 Final Destination: 1947 Dugald rail accident, 1944 Balvano train disaster 2000
 In an Instant: 1910 Rogers Pass avalanche, 1963 Vajont Dam disaster 2003
 When the Earth Moves: 1923 Great Kantō earthquake, 1972 Nicaragua earthquake 2003
 Communities Under Siege: 1958 Springhill mining disaster, 1929 Grand Banks tsunami 2003
 Death and Profits (Previously aired in Communities Under Siege) Springhill Mining Disaster, Nova Scotia, Canada - 23 October 1958 - A "bump", or earthquake, in the #2 mine causes a cave-in trapping 174 miners, and killing 74 of them. // Triangle Shirtwaist Factory Fire, New York City - 25 March 1911 - 146 of some 500 workers were killed when the factory caught fire from a discarded cigarette.  It led to reforms in sweatshop conditions.
 When Laughter turns to Tears Hartford Circus Fire – 6 July 1944 – Of the approximately 9000 attendees, some 700 were injured and 168 were killed when the Ringling Brothers and Barnum and Bailey circus tent went up in flames during an afternoon performance in Hartford CT.  The new tent, the largest tent in the world at the time, had been waterproofed with a mixture of paraffin and gasoline she flames spread quickly. Fire fighting equipment was not in its proper places. // Knickerbocker Theater Collapse - 28 January 1922 - Snow fall from a two-day blizzard caused theater to collapse, killing 98 and injuring 133.  The roof fell on the balcony which in turn fell on the orchestra section.  The blizzard slows rescue efforts.
 From Above Allegheny Airlines Flight 736 crashed while attempting to land at Bradford Regional Airport in Bradford, Pennsylvania on 24 December 1968. Twenty of the 47 occupants on board were killed. Two weeks later, Allegheny Airlines Flight 737 also crashes at Bradford.// Orléans air disaster (Previously aired in Lost in Transit)- also known as the Orléans air disaster and Villa St. Louis disaster, occurred on 15 May 1956 after a CF-100 fighter jet crashed into the Villa St. Louis in the community of Orléans, Ontario. 15 people were killed in the crash including 11 members of the Grey Nuns.
 Wrong Choice- Eastman Bus Tragedy -(Previously aired in Lost in Transit) the 4 August 1978 tragedy resulted in the loss of 41 lives when the bus plunged into Lac d'Argent, or Silver Lake, after the brakes failed.  This resulted in changes in bus safety maintenance. // New London Consolidated School Disaster - 18 March 1937, Rusk County Texas - a natural gas leak detonated when a shop teacher plugged in an electric sander and it sparked in a pocket of accumulated gas. The resulting explosion killed 295 students and teachers making it the worst catastrophe to take place in an American school.  Due to the transient nature of oilfield workers, this is only an estimate.
 Loki's Revenge - Black Friday Bush Fires - Victoria, Australia: On 13 January 1939, several bush fires joined together to form one massive front.  Almost 5,000,000 acres of land was burnt, 71 people died, and a total of 3,700 buildings were destroyed. It led to changes in forest management. // Windsor Gas Explosion - also aired in Up in Flames - On 25 October 1960, a massive gas explosion destroyed the building housing the Metropolitan Store on Ouellette Avenue. Ten people were killed and at least one hundred injured.  Blame was laid on the repairs being made to the gas heating lines in the basement.  The contractor was found at fault for not using proper procedures.   2005
 Industrial Nightmares 21 September 1921: the BASF fertilizer factory explosion in Oppau Germany results in 561 deaths and over 2000 injuries. Since the ammonium nitrate had compacted in the silo, small explosive charges were used to break it up. This was generally a safe practice.  However, this time it wasn't.  It was determined that there was a change in chemical composition in the silo that caused a blast that was felt for miles and was heard as far away as Munich, over 300 km.  // December 1930: a killer fog forms in the Meuse Valley industrial region in Belgium.  Beginning 1 December 1930, a thick fog settled over the Meuse Valley in Belgium.  The rancid air causes many to have breathing problems.  After a few days, the Guard tried to dispel the yellow, foul-smelling fog by burning brush and branches, but the smoke only added to the bad conditions.  By the time it cleared 60 people died, mostly from dyspnea, shortness of breath.  Most of the victims were elderly, the oldest being 89, but one young girl, only 20, also died.  Blame was placed on the burning of sulfurous coal for fuel.  The conditions that caused the fog also kept the fumes from rising.  Changes were made in both the use of coal for fuel and for the height of chimneys in the area. 2005
 All Fall Down December 1959: the Malpasset Dam, above the city of Fréjus, in the Provence Region of France ruptures, killing over 400 people; June 1958: Vancouver BC, The new Second Narrows Bridge collapses, killing 19, 18 workers and one rescue diver.  The accident happened as the result of an error in calculating measurements for the blueprints.  Both bridge architects were among the dead. (Also appears in Death by Water with the 1921 Britannia Beach flood.) 2005
 By Their Own Doing –  Advances in technology have made the success of human endeavour more attainable. As humans, we make mistakes and have misunderstandings that can lead to tragedy. This episode examines The Queen Mary / Curacoa Collision, as well as The Newfoundland Sealing Disaster.
 Rising From The Ashes - When a huge tidal wave hit England and the Netherlands on 1 February 1953, hundreds of dikes broke and were washed away by huge waves. The storm surge claimed 2,000 lives. // 12 January 1954 – over 200 people died in Austria's worst single avalanche.
 Stormy Waters – The greatest disaster ever to strike the Great Lakes was the 1913 Lake Huron Storm. 19 ships were lost, two dozen were thrown ashore, and 238 sailors died. // The hurricane that struck the Florida Keys on 2 September 1935, was the strongest hurricane to hit the United States at that time.
 Homes Swept Away – 1915, 1921, 1974 – Throughout history, people have built shelters to keep out the elements, from modest huts to the most elaborate mansions. But when the weather turns wild, not even the best built homes can withstand the forces of nature. Examines the Britannia Beach disaster (also in Communities Under Siege) and Cyclone Tracy (Also shown in "Nature's Fury").
 Islands Under Attack - On 28 September 1965, Taal Volcano in the Philippines erupted killing 350 people. // On 18 November 1929, a submarine earthquake off the Grand Banks triggered a huge tsunami. Homes, businesses, wharves, and fishing boats were smashed or swept away, along with the fish harvest, food, and fuel oil supplies. (Also in "Communities Under Siege").
(Also appears in another episode.)//  In 1972, Rapid City witnessed the worst storm in South Dakota's history. A creek burst its banks and washed homes, cars, and businesses away in its wake.
 No Survivors: 1998 Swissair crash, 1918 SS Princess Sophia sinking -  On its way from New York, Swiss Air 111 found its electrical systems failing one by one as a cockpit fire overheated the wiring. The crew attempted an emergency landing at Halifax Airport. //  A Canadian steamship carrying miners from Yukon and Alaska became stranded on Vanderbilt Reef.
 Friends And Family - The Ocean Ranger Disaster: In February 1982 the mobile oil drilling platform Ocean Ranger, caught in seas 30 metres high off the Grand Banks, sank to the bottom of the sea. // Hurricane Juan – On 28 September 2003, Halifax was hit by the most ferocious hurricane Nova Scotia had seen in 110 years. Winds raging up to 160 kilometers per hour pulled the freezing ocean over seawalls and into people's houses, plucked roofs from people's homes and pulled trees up from the ground. The city was brought to a standstill.
 Collision Course – In science it is known as the Butterfly Effect, change one small thing, and you change everything. Make one small mistake and the course of a life is altered forever. - 1942 USS Truxtun/USS Pollux/USS Wilkes – 18 February 1942, two US Navy destroyer and a supply ship grounded themselves on the rocks of Newfoundland's Burin Peninsula. Miners roused the surrounding towns and mounted a massive rescue effort. // 1978 Cranbrook Air Crash – On 11 February 1978 Pacific Western Airlines 737-200 crashed at Cranbrook Airport. The aircraft touched down just as the pilots noticed a snow plough on the runway. The aircraft missed the plough, overran the runway, crashed and burned.
 Fire and Ice - British Columbia Forest Fires: By August 2003, the summer's raging forest fires began to approach towns and cities in the Okanagan Valley. It was the worst fire season in British Columbia in the last hundred years. The province declared a state of emergency, evacuating tens of thousands of frightened residents. 250,000 hectares of forest turned to ash. // Toronto Snow Storm: A severe winter storm dumped 48 cm of snow on Toronto's downtown, while gale-force winds piled the snow into huge drifts.
 Against the Elements - Battery Snowslide – Two avalanches occurred in the Outer Battery in St. John's during one of the worst storms in Canadian history. The storm dumped 55 cm of snow on the city, accompanied by winds up to 220 km/h, leaving 70,000 people with no electricity. // Pine Lake Tornado – A tornado touched down on the west side of Pine Lake near the Green Acres campground on Friday 14 July 2000. Four hundred camping sites were destroyed and 12 people were killed as trailers were overturned and buildings smashed to splinters.
 Death in a Small Town – Few can say that much positive comes from a disaster. It is true, however, that many disasters effect change for the better – making our homes, transportation, and surroundings safer and preventing similar disasters from happening again. - 1971 St. Jean Vianney – St. Jean Vianney Mudslide: In the afternoon of 4 May 1971, the dogs in the Quebec town of St. Jean Vianney began to bark and whimper. Cows refused to leave their barns, and children came in from lunch, claiming that the ground was shaking and making strange noises. That night, as the town settled in for sleep, the unstable wet clay soil suddenly began to move. A hole opened up in the ground and began to suck whole houses into its maw. Families escaped from their homes and ran down the streets to get away from the widening hole. 36 homes were lost and 31 people died in the disaster. The town of St. Jean Vianney was abandoned and new building laws in Quebec were established. // 1997 St. Joseph Bus Crash – St. Joseph Bus Accident: 13 October 1997, marked the worst bus accident in North American history, when a bus in rural Quebec plunged off an embankment and killed 43 of its 48 passengers. The victims were senior citizens on a charter bus tour. Police determined that the bus was traveling too fast for the winding curves of the embankment and broke through the guardrail, falling 30 feet and landing on its side. The accident devastated the small town of St. Bernard. It was the second bus accident to happen in that spot since 1974, when a bus accident claimed the lives of 13 seniors. Citizens' groups have since urged stronger safety regulations for Quebec buses.
 End of the Line - Hinton Train Crash – On 8 February 1986, east of Hinton, Alberta, a Via Super continental passenger train collided head-on with a freight train, unleashing a flood of grain, sulphur and sewage. //  Dryden Air Crash – On 10 March 1989, a Fokker F-28 with 69 passengers aboard crashed just beyond the runway. The plane burst into flames and broke apart, killing 24 passengers and destroying the cockpit voice recorder, or "black box".
 Life in Disaster Row – Some regions seem more prone to disaster than others. Through the sheer accident of geography, life on disaster row can be fraught with frequent danger. - 1950 Red River Flood – Winnipeg is built at the confluence of two rivers, every so often the Assiniboine and Red overflow their banks and transform the city into a disaster zone. A 1950 flood was caused by heavy snow cover and sustained for 51 days by heavy rain. In low-lying areas the water actually reached a depth of nearly 15 feet, covering a full one tenth of the city in water. // Windsor Tornado – In 1946 a tornado touched down just outside Windsor and tore through the city. Seventeen people died and 400 homes were lost. People from Detroit provided valuable emergency assistance throughout the rescue and cleanup. Although no one is sure of how strong the tornado was, some experts believe it rated an F4 on the Fujita damage scale.
 Head On - On 23 February 1918, the SS Florizel, carrying 78 passengers and a crew of 60, set out amidst poor weather conditions on its regular route from St John's, Newfoundland to New York City. By 26 February, however, a storm had both diminished visibility and interfered with the ship's equipment. With the crew confused and mistaken about the ship's position, the Florizel was unwittingly captained onto a spike of rock called Horn Head near the Newfoundland coast. 94 of the 138 people on board drowned in the cold winter waters off the Newfoundland coast. // In Pictou County, Nova Scotia, the dangers of the mining profession are real and present in everyday life. This became especially true to the small mining town of Plymouth on the morning of 9 May 1992. A blast deep within the mine took the lives of 26 of its workers. It is suspected that the explosion was caused when a sudden release of methane gas, a natural by-product of coal production, was lit by a spark. 11 of the 26 killed that day were never recovered from the mine and a memorial stands today above their final resting place. Following this disaster, a thorough overhaul of provincial labour and mining laws was recommended.
 Full Stop - On a clear Thursday afternoon, 28 May 1914, the RMS Empress of Ireland left Québec City on its journey to the English port of Liverpool. Early in the morning of 29 May, a thick fog rolled in over the St. Lawrence River. During a routine attempt to pass an approaching ship, poor visibility caused a Norwegian vessel named the Storstad to ram the Empress amidships, punching a deadly hole in its side. Icy water flooded the ship. In less than fifteen minutes, the gigantic Empress of Ireland sank. Out of almost 1500 people aboard, only 465 were rescued. Today the sinking of the Empress of Ireland ranks as one of the worst peacetime disasters ever to happen in Canada. // On 10 August 1957, Maritime Central Airways Flight 315 left London, England, for Toronto. While flying over the St. Lawrence valley the following morning, the plane hit an unexpected storm which wrenched control out of the pilot's hands and forced the plane towards the ground. The Douglas DC-4 came down at a speed of nearly 350 km/h and created a hole 8 meters deep in a field near the town of Issoudun, Québec. It is felt that because the crew had been on duty for nearly 20 hours at that time, their performances were drastically compromised. It was the first major civilian air disaster in Canadian history. From this tragic and avoidable loss of life, a Canadian standard has been developed to limit shift length and prevent future disasters of this magnitude. Today, a monument marks the spot where 79 passengers and crew lost their lives. (More about Accident)
 Out of the Blue - Blue Bird Café fire – On 1 September 1972, patrons of Montreal's Blue Bird Café and the Wagon Wheel, the country and western bar above the café, were celebrating the end of another summer. In the main entrance to the Wagon Wheel, however, 3 young men, drunk and upset over being refused entry to the bar began a fire on the staircase. With one exit now blocked by fire, victims sought out other means of escape. However, conflicting city regulations had left the Wagon Wheel with too few fire exits. This left only two escape routes, through the kitchen onto a foldaway fire escape, and through the window in the ladies washroom onto a car parked below. Due to these errors in judgement, 37 people were unable to escape the fire and smoke that night. Fire escape regulations have since been standardised to prevent another disaster of this magnitude. // Air Canada Flight 621 on 5 July 1970 from Montreal to Los Angeles, called the "Champagne Flight" due to its typical fun-loving, holiday crowd, was set to make a scheduled stop in Toronto when disaster struck. A minor misunderstanding in the cockpit over landing procedures caused the first officer to deploy the ground spoilers manually while in the air. The plane nosed downwards and struck the runway briefly before lifting off again. The captain managed to pull the damaged plane around for another attempt at landing, but as he did so the plane began to disintegrate in the air while an explosion blew off the right wing, killing all 100 passengers and 6 crewmembers on board.
 In the Blink of an Eye - Eager to reap the benefits of a good week of fishing, over one hundred men and boys from the village of Escuminac, New Brunswick took to the waters of Miramichi Bay on Friday, 19 June 1959. By 10 pm, however, the strong northeasterly winds that had been blowing all week became a storm that stirred up 50-foot waves and impossible-to-navigate winds. While 86 fishermen did survive the storm that night, the water took 35 men and boys, devastating the small fishing villages of Escuminac, Baie du Vin, and Baie Ste-Anne. In Escuminac, a monument to the lost souls now stands as a reminder of those needless losses and as a promise for the future. // The Flora Alberta, a fishing vessel with 28 men aboard, was sailing near the Nova Scotia coast on 23 April 1943 when it was rammed by a military steamship and cut practically in two. At the time, World War II was raging in Europe and the Fanad Head was part of a convoy traveling in the Nova Scotia area. Due to a thick fog the two ships were unable to see each other until minutes before the accident and although every effort was made to avoid collision, little could be done. The Flora Alberta foundered so quickly that the three lifeboats lowered by the Fanad Head were able to rescue only 7 of the 28 people.
 Coast To Coast - 1900 Galveston hurricane. 8 September 1900 saw the advent of North America's most destructive natural disaster to date. With winds of up to 150 mph and waters surging up to 16 feet high, this hurricane first hit Galveston, Texas before making its way through the American Midwest and into Canada's maritime provinces. Tearing first through Southern Ontario, the storm wreaked havoc on homes and farms, killing one man in Niagara Falls. The storm picked up strength again as it hit the Maritimes and began to devastate the fishing fleets in the Gulf of St. Lawrence and the Grand Banks. At least 86 Canadians were killed in the storm, although it is suspected that even more were lost. Following this storm, Newfoundland requested that Canada's storm warning system be extended throughout their province as well, in the hopes that future losses would be prevented by advance knowledge of upcoming storms. //  Typhoon Freda, known as the Columbus Day Storm in the United States, began in the Pacific Ocean and merged with another tropical storm before hitting the west coast of Canada and the Northern United States on 12 October 1962. Freda was one of the largest storms of the century, stretching from San Francisco to the northern BC coasts, devastating Vancouver Island and the lower mainland. Hardest hit in Vancouver was Stanley Park, losing one third of its approximately 10,000 trees. In total, seven people died in Canada and millions of dollars in property were lost. In the wake of the storm, the Canadian government made substantial improvements in its disaster response planning.
 Sitting Ducks
 Soldiers at Rest - Knights of Columbus Hostel fire. On the night of Saturday 12 December 1942, hundreds of American servicemen and residents of St. John's, Newfoundland were gathered for a night of music at the Knights of Columbus hostel. At 11:10 pm a blaze that had started in the attic tore through the building burning the hostel quickly. Its windows and doors, locked and covered for blackout purposes, left victims searching for exits. In total, 99 partygoers lost their lives that night, while 109 more were left wounded by the fire. The Knights of Columbus Fire ranks as one of the worst disasters in Newfoundland history. Today fire regulations have been put in place to prevent such tragedies from happening again. // Canoe River train crash. On 21 November 1950, a train with 388 Canadian soldiers en route to the US for training collided with an eastbound passenger train. They met on a curve near Canoe River, British Columbia where track visibility was limited and falling snow prevented the engineers from seeing the opposing train's smoke. While the cars of the passenger train were built entirely of steel, the troop train consisted of some steel cars and some wooden cars with steel framing. These wooden cars were surrounded by steel and buckled under the pressure of impact. All aboard the passenger train survived, but 4 railroad workers and 17 soldiers were killed. Following this collision, regulations that were already in place to ensure that wooden cars be placed at the end of the train were reinforced and the Canadian National Railway began to phase out the use of wooden cars.
 Frozen Hell - Saturday 15 March 1941 was a beautiful spring day that saw much of the winter's snow melting quickly away. The afternoon took a turn for the worse, however, when an Alberta clipper, a particularly devastating type of blizzard, swept across the Canadian Prairie Provinces and into the United States. This type of storm arises and dissipates with little to no warning and as a result, is one of the deadliest types of blizzards experienced on the prairies. This particular storm, although lasting only 7 hours, took the lives of 8 Canadians and at least 70 Americans. // After days of heavy snowfall, at least 60 inches of wet, heavy snow were left to settle on the mountainside above the Granduc mining development. In the morning of 18 February 1965 a massive avalanche claimed the lives of 26 of their coworkers. This avalanche destroyed most of the Granduc campsite. While few safety precautions had been taken prior to the avalanche, the Granduc mining company was swift to follow the avalanche with safety regulations that they hoped would prevent such a massive loss of life in the future.
 Safe Passage - In the spring of 1931, film director Varick Frissel commissioned the sealing ship SS Viking to shoot action sequences for his new film. Along with his crew and equipment, Frissel had brought barrels of gunpowder aboard. The extra gunpowder was poorly stored and left in contact with sources of flame. In the evening of 15 March, as the ship's crew prepared for bed, the gunpowder ignited. Survivors abandoned ship for the ice pans and trudged over 20 kilometres of ice and water to the remote Horse Islands, where local residents took them in. 65 people, including Varrick Frissel, died in the disaster. // On 18 September 1946, a DC-4 from Belgium's Sabena Airlines began its approach into Gander International Airport, Newfoundland for a refueling stop. On its way in, bad weather flared up and the crew, unable to get their bearings in the storm, flew over the airport. The plane crashed into a densely wooded area, killing 27 of the 44 on board. The crash, not spotted until the following day, was nearly impossible for rescue crews to access. Eventually, two helicopters were brought in from the United States Coast Guard to aid in the rescue of the survivors. Even with this new rescue technology, it was not until 22 September that all survivors had been removed to safety. The pilots of these helicopters received the US Air Medal and the Belgian "Knight of the Order of Leopold" and it was ensured that their helicopters would have a permanent place in the Coast Guard's flight line. Actors in this series were Regina SK Locals Including; Rie Frank And Dana Anthony.

References

External links
Disasters of the Century Short description and List for the first 26 episodes

History (Canadian TV network) original programming
Television series by Corus Entertainment
2010s Canadian documentary television series
Documentary films about disasters